The following is a list of  ethnic groups in Laos.

Classification
Specialists are largely in agreement as to the ethnolinguistic classification of the ethnic groups of Laos. For the purposes of the 1995 census, the government of Laos recognized 149 ethnic groups within 47 main ethnicities. whereas the Lao Front for National Construction (LFNC) recently revised the list to include 49 ethnicities consisting of over 160 ethnic groups.

The term ethnic minorities is used by some to classify the non-Lao ethnic groups, while the term indigenous peoples is not used by Lao authorities. These 160 ethnic groups speak a total of 82 distinct living languages.

Mon-Khmer
Aheu (population of approximately 1,770 in Bolikhamsai Province)
Alak (population of approximately 4,000 in southern Laos)
Arem (population of approximately 500 in Laos)
Bo (population of 2,950 in Laos)
Bru (population of approximately 69,000 in Laos)
Chut (population of 450 in Khammouane Province)
Halang Doan (population of 2,350 in Attapeu Province and on the Kasseng Plateau)
Hung or Tum (population of 2,000 in Bolikhamsai and Khammouane Provinces)
Ir (population of 4,420 in Salavan Province)
Jeh (population of 8,013 in southern Laos)
Katang (population of 107,350 in Laos)
Katu (population of 14,700 in Laos)
Khlor (population of 6,000 in Laos)
Khmer (population of 10,400 in Laos)
Khua (population of 2,000 in Laos)
Kri
Kuy (population of 51,180 in Laos)
Lavae (also referred to as Brao)
Lave (population of 12,750 in Laos)
Laven (population of 40,519 in Laos)
Lavi
Maleng (population of 800 in Laos)
Mon
Ngae (population of 12,189 in Laos)
Nguon
Nyaheun
Ong
Oi (population of 23,500 in Laos)
Pakoh
Phong
Sadang
Salang (ethnic group)
Sapuan (ethnic group)
Makong
Sou
Souei
Taliang
Ta-oi
Vietnamese (population of 76,000 in Laos)
Yae

Palaungic
Bit (population of 1,530 in Laos, disputed as to whether Palaungic or Khmuic)
Con (population of 1,000 in Luang Namtha Province)
Samtao (population of 2,359 in Laos)
Lamet (population of 16,740 in Laos)

Khmuic

Khmu (population of 389,694 in Laos)
Khuen (population of approximately 8,000 in Laos)
Mal (population of 23,200 in Laos)
Mlabri (population of 24 in Laos, also known as the Yumbri)
O'du
Phai (population of 15,000 in Laos)
Xinh Mul (population of 3,164 in Laos, including Phong-Kniang and Puoc, also known as the Sing Mun)

Tibeto-Burman
Lolo ethnicity
Kaw (population of approximately 58,000 in Laos)
Hani (population of 1,122 in Phongsaly Province)
Kaduo (population of 5,000 on Laos-China border)
Lahu (population of 8,702 in Laos, also referred to as Museu)
Lahu Shi (population of 3,240 in Laos)
Phana
Phunoi
Si La
Kado (population of 225 in Phongsaly Province)

Hmong-Mien
Hmong Daw (population of 200,000 in Laos)
Hmong Njua (population of 245,600 in Laos)
Iu Mien (population of 20,250, also called Yao)
Kim Mun (population of 4,500 in Laos)

Tai and Rau

Tai Daeng
Tai Dam
Tai Gapong
Tai He (or Tai E)
Tai Khang (population of 47,636 in Laos)
Tay Khang
Tai Kao
Kongsat
Kuan (population of 2,500 in Laos)
Tai Laan
Tai Maen
Lao (population of 3,000,000 in Laos)
Lao Lom
Tai Long
Tai Lue (population of 300,000 in Laos)
Northeastern Thai (including the Tai Kaleun and Isan people)
Tai Nuea
Kassak (located to the south and southeast of Luang Prabang, in an area bounded by the Nam Khan River, Phu Hin Salik, Nam Sanane River, Nam Ming River, and Nam Khan River up to Xieng Ngeun District). The Kassak language is a Lao dialect, although the Kassak people live a lifestyle similar to that of the Khmu people.
Nùng
Nyaw
Tai Pao
Tai Peung
Phuan (population of 106,099 in Laos)
Phutai (population of 154,400 in Laos)
Saek
Tai Sam
Tai Yo
Tayten
Yoy
Zhuang (including the Nùng people)
Shan
Yang

Chinese
Chinese
Laotian Chinese

Unclassified
Chere
Jri

Below are some ethnic groups of Laos who speak unclassified languages, listed roughly from north to south. District codes are also given (see districts of Laos).

See also
 Demographics of Laos

References

Further reading
 
 

 
Laos
Ethn